Mutěnice is a municipality and village in Hodonín District in the South Moravian Region of the Czech Republic. It has about 3,700 inhabitants. It is known for wine-growing and wine-making.

Geography
It lies mostly in the Kyjov Hills, the eastern part lies in the Lower Morava Valley. The Kyjovka River flows through the eastern part of the municipality and supplies several ponds.

History
The village of Mutěnice was probably founded by external colonization of the area by the Knights Templar, who owned the area in the 13th century. From 1312, the area of Mutěnice and neighbouring Čejkovice belonged to Knights Hospitaller. The order built a commandery in the area, first mentioned in 1349. The first written mention of Mutěnice is from 1367.

Between 1537 and 1594, Mutěnice was owned by the lords of Lipá. From that time is documented existence of a fortress here. The lords of Lipá sold it to the Salm family, who soon sold it and the village further often changed owners. Between 1565 and 1605, a community of Anabatists settled here. The village was devastated by the Thirty Years' War. The population has declined to a quarter.

Demographics

Economy
Mutěnice is known for viticulture. The municipality is the largest in the Slovácká wine sub-region.

Transport
Mutěnice lies on the railway of local importance from Hodonín to Zaječí.

Sights
The most significant monument is the Baroque parish Church of Saint Catherine. It was built in 1769–1775 by order of Empress Maria Theresa on the site of a former desolated chapel. The current appearance of the church is after the reconstructions in the 20th century.

Mutěnice is known for búdy, which are above-ground wine cellars and presses of folk architecture. There is about 550 of these buildings. The oldest are from the early 18th century.

The neo-Renaissance municipal office was built 1896.

Notable people
Tomáš Garrigue Masaryk (1850–1937), politician and first Czechoslovak president; lived here in 1852–1853

References

External links

 

Villages in Hodonín District
Moravian Slovakia